Stanbridge is a town/community in Leeton Shire, New South Wales, Australia. It is in the central part of the Riverina.

A major employer is Freedom Foods, a maker of health foods including cereals biscuits and bars.  The company moved to Stanbridge from Melbourne in 2009 and employs about 76 people.

Notes and references

Towns in the Riverina
Towns in New South Wales
Leeton Shire